Focillidia is a genus of moths in the family Erebidae first described by George Hampson in 1913.

Species
 Focillidia grenadensis Hampson, 1913
 Focillidia texana Hampson, 1913

References

Poaphilini
Heteroneura genera